Pavel Karoch (born 2 November 1963 in the Czech Republic) is a Czech retired footballer.

References

Czech footballers
Living people
1963 births
Association football midfielders
FK Dukla Prague players